Il Giro Del Giorno in 80 Mondi is an album by Italian jazz trumpeter and composer Enrico Rava recorded in 1972 and originally released in the International label and rereleased on the Italian Black Saint label in 1976.

Reception
The Allmusic review by Michael G. Nastos awarded the album 4½ stars calling it "A recording that is "out" and sometimes funky".

Track listing
All compositions by Enrico Rava except as indicated
 "C.T.'s Dance" - 5:29 
 "Back to the Sun" - 5:09 
 "Xanadu" - 4:32 
 "Attica" - 2:24 
 "Il Giro del Giorno in 80 Mondi" - 7:11 
 "To Start With Rava" - 5:13 
 "Olhos de Gato" (Carla Bley) - 3:15 
Recorded at Fonit-Cetra Studios in Turin, Italy in February 1972

Personnel
Enrico Rava - trumpet
Bruce Johnson - guitar
Marcello Melis - bass
Chip White - drums

References

Black Saint/Soul Note albums
Enrico Rava albums
1976 albums